The second season of the FLCL anime series, titled FLCL Progressive, is produced by Production I.G, Toho, and Adult Swim's production arm Williams Street. Progressive was chief directed by Katsuyuki Motohiro, with screenplay by Hideto Iwai. It originally aired from June 3 to July 7, 2018 in the United States on Adult Swim's Toonami programming block. In Japan, Progressive received a theatrical screening as a compilation film, with it opening on September 28, 2018. In addition to providing several tracks for the season, The Pillows performed the ending theme song "Spiky Seeds".

In this season, Haruko returns to Earth years later after a failed attempt to contain Atomsk, although she did manage to absorb him. Placing herself as a middle school homeroom teacher, Haruko targets a 14-year-old girl named Hidomi Hibajiri through her classmate and eventual love interest Ko Ide.


Episode list

Home media release

Japanese

English

References

External links
Official Gainax website 
Official Adult Swim website

FLCL episode lists